Gaultheria is a genus of about 283 species of shrubs in the family Ericaceae. The name commemorates Jean François Gaultier of Quebec, an honour bestowed by the Scandinavian Pehr Kalm in 1748 and taken up by Carl Linnaeus in his . These plants are native to Asia, Australasia and North and South America. In the past, the Southern Hemisphere species were often treated as the separate genus Pernettya, but no consistent reliable morphological or genetic differences support recognition of two genera, and they are now united in the single genus Gaultheria.

Description
The flowers are solitary or in racemes, bell-shaped, with a five-lobed (rarely four-lobed) corolla; flower colour ranges from white to pink to red. The fruit is a fleshy berry in many species, a dry capsule in some, with numerous small seeds.

Uses
Several species are grown as ornamental shrubs in gardens, particularly G. mucronata (Pernettya mucronata) from southern Chile and Argentina and G. shallon (salal) from the Pacific Northwest of North America. Many of the smaller species are suitable for rock gardens. Like most other ericaceous plants, Gaultheria species do best in peaty soil that never fully dries out.

The fruit of many Gaultheria species is edible, particularly that of salal, which can be used to make jelly. One, the American wintergreen or eastern teaberry, G. procumbens, is the traditional source of wintergreen flavouring; it is called the eastern teaberry because its leaves can be used to make a tea, and its berries can be eaten without preparation. The fruit of most other Gaultheria species is insipid in flavour and not extensively consumed.

One variety of G. leucocarpa shows anti-inflammatory properties and is used in Chinese herbal medicine for the treatment of rheumatoid arthritis, swelling, and pain.

Species
, Plants of the World Online recognises 283 species:

Gaultheria abanii (Argent) Kron & P.W.Fritsch – Borneo (Sabah)
Gaultheria abbreviata J.J.Sm. – northern and central Sumatra
Gaultheria abscondita (Sleumer) Kron & P.W.Fritsch – northern Borneo
Gaultheria acroleia Sleumer – Sumatra
Gaultheria acuminata Schltdl. & Cham. – Mexico to Honduras
Gaultheria adenothrix (Miq.) Maxim. – Japan
Gaultheria akaensis S.Panda & Sanjappa – eastern Himalayas
Gaultheria albiflora (T.Z.Hsu) P.W.Fritsch & Lu Lu – Bhutan to south-central China (Yunnan and Sichuan)
Gaultheria alnifolia (Dunal) A.C.Sm. – northeastern Colombia to Venezuela
Gaultheria amboinensis (Becc.) Kron & P.W.Fritsch – Maluku (Ambon)
Gaultheria amoena A.C.Sm. – southern Colombia to Ecuador
Gaultheria anastomosans (Mutis ex L.f.) Kunth – Colombia to northwestern Venezuela
Gaultheria angustifolia Brandegee – central Mexico (Puebla, México, Michoacán, and Jalisco)
Gaultheria annamensis (Sleumer) Kron & P.W.Fritsch – southern Vietnam
Gaultheria antarctica Hook.f. – southern Chile, southern Argentina, Falkland Islands
Gaultheria antipoda G.Forst. - snowberry or fools beech – New Zealand
Gaultheria aperta (J.J.Sm.) Kron & P.W.Fritsch – southwestern Sulawesi
Gaultheria apiculifera (J.J.Sm.) Kron & P.W.Fritsch – west-central Sumatra
Gaultheria apoensis (Elmer) Kron & P.W.Fritsch – Philippines (Mindanao)
Gaultheria appressa A.W.Hill - waxberry or white waxberry – southeastern Australia
Gaultheria arfakana Sleumer – northwestern New Guinea
Gaultheria argentii Kron & P.W.Fritsch – northern Borneo
Gaultheria atjehensis J.J.Sm. – northern Sumatra
Gaultheria aurea (Sleumer) Kron & P.W.Fritsch – northern Borneo
Gaultheria auyantepuiensis Kron & P.W.Fritsch – Venezuela (Bolívar)
Gaultheria balgooyi (Argent) Kron & P.W.Fritsch – Sulawesi
Gaultheria barbigera (Sleumer) Kron & P.W.Fritsch – Borneo (Sarawak)
Gaultheria barbulata Sleumer – Sumatra (Mt. Losir)
Gaultheria bartolomei (Ferreras & Argent) Kron & P.W.Fritsch – Philippines
Gaultheria beamanii Kron & P.W.Fritsch – northern Borneo
Gaultheria beccarii Kron & P.W.Fritsch – Borneo
Gaultheria benitotanii (Argent) Kron & P.W.Fritsch – Philippines
Gaultheria benomensis Kron & P.W.Fritsch – Peninsular Malaysia (Pahang)
Gaultheria berberidifolia Sleumer – New Guinea (Arfak Mountains)
Gaultheria × biluoensis P.W.Fritsch & Lu Lu – G. crassifolia × G. major – China (Yunnan)
Gaultheria borneensis Stapf – Taiwan, Philippines, northern Borneo
Gaultheria brachyantha (Sleumer) Kron & P.W.Fritsch –  northern Sumatra
Gaultheria bracteata (Cav.) G.Don – Ecuador (Tungurahua) to Bolivia
Gaultheria bradeana Sleumer – Brazil (Minas Gerais, Rio de Janeiro, and Santa Catarina)
Gaultheria brevistipes (C.Y.Wu & T.Z.Hsu) R.C.Fang – Arunachal Pradesh to southeastern Tibet
Gaultheria bryoides P.W.Fritsch & L.H.Zhou – China (Yunnan) to northern Myanmar
Gaultheria buxifolia Willd. – Colombia and Venezuela
Gaultheria caespitosa Poepp. & Endl. – central and southern Chile, southern Argentina
Gaultheria campii Kron & P.W.Fritsch – Venezuela (Bolívar)
Gaultheria capitata (Sleumer) Kron & P.W.Fritsch – Sulawesi
Gaultheria cardiosepala Hand.-Mazz. – China (western Yunnan) to northern Myanmar
Gaultheria cardonae (A.C.Sm.) Kron & P.W.Fritsch – Venezuela (Bolívar)
Gaultheria carrii (Sleumer) Kron & P.W.Fritsch – northern Borneo
Gaultheria caryophylloides (J.J.Sm.) Kron & P.W.Fritsch – southeastern Sulawesi
Gaultheria caudatifolia (Sleumer) Kron & P.W.Fritsch – northern Borneo
Gaultheria celebensis (J.J.Sm.) Kron & P.W.Fritsch – central Sulawesi
Gaultheria celebica J.J.Sm. – central Sulawesi (Mt. Sinadji)
Gaultheria chiriquensis Camp – Panama (Volcán Barú)
Gaultheria ciliisepala Airy Shaw ex P.W.Fritsch & Lu Lu – Tibet to China (Yunnan) and northern Myanmar
Gaultheria ciliolata (Hook.f.) F.Muell. – northern Borneo
Gaultheria cinnabarina (Sleumer) Kron & P.W.Fritsch – Sumatra
Gaultheria cinnamomifolia (Stapf) Kron & P.W.Fritsch – northern Borneo
Gaultheria clementium (Sleumer) Kron & P.W.Fritsch – northern Borneo
Gaultheria codonantha Airy Shaw – Arunachal Pradesh and southeastern Tibet
Gaultheria coi (Argent) Kron & P.W.Fritsch – Philippines (Mindoro)
Gaultheria colensoi Hook.f. – New Zealand (North Island)
Gaultheria commutata (Sleumer) Kron & P.W.Fritsch – northern Borneo
Gaultheria consobrina (Becc.) Kron & P.W.Fritsch – Borneo (southwestern Sarawak)
Gaultheria corvensis (R.R.Silva & Cervi) Romão & Kin.-Gouv. – Brazil (Santa Catarina)
Gaultheria crassa Allan – New Zealand
Gaultheria crassifolia (Airy Shaw) P.W.Fritsch & Lu Lu – Tibet to China (Yunnan) and northern Myanmar
Gaultheria cuneata (Rehder & E.H.Wilson) Bean –  Nepal and China (western Sichuan and northern Yunnan) 
Gaultheria depressa Hook.f. - mountain snow berry or alpine wax berry – Tasmania and New Zealand
Gaultheria dialypetala Sleumer – central-western Sumatra (Mount Talakmau)
Gaultheria discolor Nutt. ex Hook. – Bhutan and eastern Himalayas to China (western and southeastern Yunnan)
Gaultheria dolichopoda Airy Shaw – Arunachal Pradesh to China (Yunnan) and northern Myanmar
Gaultheria domingensis Urb. – Hispaniola and Lesser Antilles
Gaultheria dumicola W.W.Sm. – Arunachal Pradesh to China (western Yunnan)
Gaultheria eciliata (Rae & D.G.Long) P.W.Fritsch & L.H.Zhou - Eastern Himalayas to China (northwestern Yunnan)
Gaultheria edulis (Schltr.) Kron & P.W.Fritsch – western New Guinea
Gaultheria ensifolia (Merr.) Kron & P.W.Fritsch – northern Borneo
Gaultheria epiphytica (H.R.Fletcher) Kron & P.W.Fritsch – Peninsular Thailand
Gaultheria erecta Vent. – Mexico to northwestern Argentina and southern Brazil
Gaultheria eriophylla (Pers.) Mart. ex Sleumer eastern Brazil
Gaultheria eymae Kron & P.W.Fritsch – central Sulawesi
Gaultheria × fagifolia Hook.f. – New Zealand (North Island)
Gaultheria filipes (Sleumer) Kron & P.W.Fritsch – central Sulawesi
Gaultheria fimbriata (Sleumer) Kron & P.W.Fritsch – Borneo (Gunung Mulu in Sarawak)
Gaultheria floribunda (Camp) ined. – Venezuela (Bolívar)
Gaultheria foliolosa Benth. – Colombia, Ecuador, and Peru
Gaultheria fragrantissima Wall. – India, Tibet, south-central China, Myanmar, Vietnam, Peninsular Malaysia, Sumatra, and Java
Gaultheria gajoensis Kron & P.W.Fritsch – northern Sumatra
Gaultheria gallowayana (Argent) Kron & P.W.Fritsch – Sulawesi
Gaultheria glaucicaulis (Argent) Kron & P.W.Fritsch – Sulawesi
Gaultheria glauciflora (Sleumer) Kron & P.W.Fritsch – northern Sumatra
Gaultheria glaucifolia Hemsl. – Mexico (Durango and Jalisco)
Gaultheria glomerata (Cav.) Sleumer – Venezuela to Bolivia
Gaultheria gonggashanensis P.W.Fritsch & Lu Lu – China (Sichuan)
Gaultheria gracilescens Sleumer – western New Guinea
Gaultheria gracilipes (J.J.Sm.) Kron & P.W.Fritsch – southwestern Sulawesi
Gaultheria gracilis Small – Costa Rica and Panama
Gaultheria griffithiana Wight Eastern Nepal to south-central China and Vietnam
Gaultheria haemantha (Sleumer) Kron & P.W.Fritsch – central Sulawesi
Gaultheria hapalotricha A.C.Sm. – Venezuela, Colombia, Peru, and Bolivia
Gaultheria hendrianiana (Argent) Kron & P.W.Fritsch – Sulawesi
Gaultheria heteromera R.C.Fang – Arunachal Pradesh and southeast Tibet
Gaultheria hirta Ridl. – Peninsula Malaysia (Perak: Gunung Korbu)
Gaultheria hispida R.Br. - snow berry – Tasmania
Gaultheria hispidula (L.) Muhl. ex Bigelow - creeping snowberry or moxie-plum – Canada and the northern United States
Gaultheria hookeri C.B.Clarke – Nepal, Tibet, and the eastern Himalayas to south-Central China
Gaultheria howellii (Sleumer) D.J.Middleton – Galápagos
Gaultheria humifusa (Graham) Rydb. - alpine wintergreen or alpine spicy wintergreen – western Canada and western United States
Gaultheria hypochlora Airy Shaw – Arunachal Pradesh, Tibet, China (Sichuan and Yunnan) and northern Myanmar
Gaultheria insana (Molina) D.J.Middleton south-central Chile and southern Argentina
Gaultheria insipida Benth. - chichaja – Colombia and Ecuador
Gaultheria × intermedia J.J.Sm. – G. leucocarpa × G. punctata – Sumatra and Java
Gaultheria itatiaiae Wawra – southeastern and southern Brazil
Gaultheria japonica (A.Gray) Sleumer – Japan (northern and central Honshu)
Gaultheria jiewhoei (Mustaqim) Kron & P.W.Fritsch – Sulawesi
Gaultheria jingdongensis R.C.Fang – China (west-central Yunnan)
Gaultheria × jordanensis Brade & Sleum. – G. eriophylla × G. itatiaiae – southeastern Brazil
Gaultheria kalimantanensis (P.Wilkie & Argent) Kron & P.W.Fritsch Borneo (Meratus Mountains)
Gaultheria kalmiifolia (Sleumer) Kron & P.W.Fritsch – Borneo (Sarawak)
Gaultheria kamengiana S.Panda & Sanjappa – Arunachal Pradesh
Gaultheria kemiriensis Sleumer – Sumatra
Gaultheria kemulensis (J.J.Sm.) Kron & P.W.Fritsch – east-central Borneo (Mount Kemul)
Gaultheria kinabaluensis (Stapf) Kron & P.W.Fritsch – northern Borneo
Gaultheria kingii (Merr.) Kron & P.W.Fritsch – Malay Peninsula, Borneo, and northern Sumatra
Gaultheria kitangladensis (P.W.Fritsch) Kron & P.W.Fritsch – Philippines (Mindanao)
Gaultheria kjellbergii (J.J.Sm.) Kron & P.W.Fritsch – southeastern Sulawesi
Gaultheria kosteri (Sleumer) Kron & P.W.Fritsch – western New Guinea
Gaultheria kostermansii (Sleumer) Kron & P.W.Fritsch – Borneo (east-central Kalimantan)
Gaultheria lamii (J.J.Sm.) Kron & P.W.Fritsch – northwestern New Guinea (Mt. Doorman)
Gaultheria lanceolata Hook.f. – Tasmania
Gaultheria lanigera Hook. – Ecuador
Gaultheria leschenaultii DC.
Gaultheria leucocarpa Blume
Gaultheria lohitiensis S.Panda & Sanjappa
Gaultheria longibracteolata R.C.Fang
Gaultheria longiracemosa Y.C.Yang
Gaultheria losirensis Sleumer
Gaultheria macrostigma (Colenso) D.J.Middleton
Gaultheria malayana Airy Shaw
Gaultheria marginata (N.E.Br.) D.J.Middleton
Gaultheria megalodonta A.C.Sm.
Gaultheria minuta Merr.
Gaultheria mucronata (L.f.) Hook. & Arn. - prickly heath or chaura
Gaultheria mundula F.Muell.
Gaultheria myrsinoides Kunth
Gaultheria myrtilloides Cham. & Schltdl.
Gaultheria notabilis J.Anthony
Gaultheria novaguineensis J.J.Sm.
Gaultheria nubicola D.J.Middleton
Gaultheria nubigena (Phil.) B.L.Burtt & Sleum.
Gaultheria nummularioides D.Don
Gaultheria oppositifolia Hook.f. - kama, niniwa or snowberry
Gaultheria oreogena A.C.Sm.
Gaultheria ovatifolia A.Gray - western teaberry or Oregon spicy wintergreen
Gaultheria paniculata B.L.Burtt & A.W.Hill
Gaultheria parvula D.J.Middleton
Gaultheria pernettyoides Sleumer
Gaultheria phillyreifolia (Pers.) Sleumer
Gaultheria poeppigii DC.
Gaultheria praticola C.Y.Wu
Gaultheria procumbens L. - eastern teaberry, checkerberry, boxberry, or American wintergreen
Gaultheria prostrata W.W.Sm.
Gaultheria pseudonotabilis H.Li ex R.C.Fang
Gaultheria pullei J.J.Sm.
Gaultheria pumila (L.f.) D.J.Middleton
Gaultheria puradyatmikae (Mustaqim, Utteridge & Heatubun) Kron & P.W.Fritsch
Gaultheria purpurascens Kunth
Gaultheria purpurea R.C.Fang
Gaultheria pyrolifolia Hook.f. ex C.B.Clarke
Gaultheria pyroloides Hook.f. & Thomson ex Miq.
Gaultheria racemulosa (DC.) D.J.Middleton
Gaultheria rengifoana Phil.
Gaultheria reticulata Kunth
Gaultheria rigida Kunth
Gaultheria rupestris (L.f.) R.Br.
Gaultheria salicifolia Phil.
Gaultheria santanderensis A.C.Sm.
Gaultheria schultesii Camp
Gaultheria sclerophylla Cuatrec.
Gaultheria semi-infera (C.B.Clarke) Airy Shaw
Gaultheria serrata (Vell.) Kin.-Gouv. ex Luteyn
Gaultheria × serrulata Herzog
Gaultheria seshagiriana Subba Rao & Kumari
Gaultheria setulosa N.E.Br.
Gaultheria shallon Pursh - salal, shallon, or gaultheria
Gaultheria sinensis J.Anthony
Gaultheria sleumeri Smitinand & P.H.Hô
Gaultheria sleumeriana Kin.-Gouv.
Gaultheria solitaria Sleumer
Gaultheria stereophylla A.C.Sm.
Gaultheria steyermarkii Luteyn
Gaultheria straminea R.C.Fang
Gaultheria strigosa Benth.
Gaultheria subcorymbosa Colenso
Gaultheria suborbicularis W.W.Sm.
Gaultheria taiwaniana S.S.Ying
Gaultheria tasmanica (Hook.f.) D.J.Middleton
Gaultheria tenuifolia (Phil.) Sleumer
Gaultheria tetramera W.W.Sm.
Gaultheria thymifolia Stapf ex Airy Shaw
Gaultheria tomentosa Kunth
Gaultheria trichophylla Royle - Himalayan snowberry
Gaultheria trigonoclada R.C.Fang
Gaultheria ulei Sleumer
Gaultheria vaccinioides Griseb. ex Wedd.
Gaultheria vernalis Kunze ex DC.
Gaultheria viridiflora Sleumer
Gaultheria wardii C.Marquand & Airy-Shaw

References

 
Ericaceae genera